Business Nashville Magazine, a regional glossy, was published monthly with a local circulation of about 16,000 until it was acquired by NashvillePost.com in 2001. In 2003 it developed into a new incarnation, Business Tennessee, focused on business and political happenings in Tennessee with a circulation of near 40,000 statewide. It was published in both online and traditional formats.

References

Business magazines published in the United States
Monthly magazines published in the United States
Defunct magazines published in the United States
Local interest magazines published in the United States
Magazines with year of establishment missing
Magazines disestablished in 2003
Magazines published in Tennessee